Hans Magnus Enzensberger (11 November 1929 – 24 November 2022) was a German author, poet, translator, and editor. He also wrote under the pseudonyms Andreas Thalmayr, Elisabeth Ambras, Linda Quilt and Giorgio Pellizzi. Enzensberger was regarded as one of the literary founding figures of the Federal Republic of Germany and wrote more than 70 books, with works translated into 40 languages. He was one of the leading authors in Group 47, and influenced the 1968 West German student movement. He was awarded the Georg Büchner Prize and the Pour le Mérite, among many others.

Life and career 
Enzensberger was born in 1929 in Kaufbeuren, a small town in Bavaria, as the eldest of four boys. His father, Andreas Enzensberger, worked as a telecommunications technician, and his mother, Leonore (Ledermann) Enzensberger a kindergarten teacher. Enzensberger was part of the last generation of intellectuals whose writing was shaped by first-hand experience of Nazi Germany. The Enzensberger family moved to Nuremberg in 1931. Julius Streicher, the founder and publisher of the virulently antisemitic Der Stürmer, was their next-door neighbour. Hans Magnus joined the Hitler Youth in his teens, but was expelled soon afterwards. "I have always been incapable of being a good comrade. I can't stay in line. It's not in my character. It may be a defect, but I can't help it."

In 1949, after completing his Abitur in Nördlingen, Enzensberger studied literature and philosophy at the universities of Erlangen, Freiburg, and Hamburg, and at the Sorbonne in Paris, receiving his doctorate in 1955 for a thesis about Clemens Brentano's poetry. Until 1957 he worked as a radio editor in Stuttgart with Alfred Andersch; he criticized in a radio essay Der Spiegels language style. He became one of the leading authors in the Group 47, an institution that shaped the culture of Germany after World War II. In 1957 Group 47 member Ingeborg Bachmann and Enzensberger began to exchange letters. His first literary publication was the poem collection verteidigung der wölfe (Defense of the Wolves) in 1957, followed by landessprache in 1960, both originally in all-lowercase. They were perceived as opposition to the establishment of those who had been on battle fields and in camps, described as "furious, elegant and of controlled rage" ("furios, elegant und von kontrollierter Wut"). He played the role "zorniger junger Mann" (angry young man) as British role models. In 1960, he was the editor of Museum der modernen Poesie (Museum of modern poetry), an anthology of poems by contemporary authors in a juxtaposition of original and translation, which was rare at the time. From 1960 to 1961, Enzensberger was a literary editor at Suhrkamp in Frankfurt. He spoke several languages, intensified by travels: English, French, Italian, Spanish, Norwegian, Swedish and some Russian. With a volume of essays published in 1962, Einzelheiten, he entered the position of a critical intellectual which he held for life. 

Between 1965 and 1975 he lived briefly in the United States (Fellow of the Center for Advanced Studies Wesleyan University) and Cuba. He had the composer Hans Werner Henze invited to Cuba in 1969, and wrote the libretto for his El Cimarrón for baritone and three instrumentalists based on the memories of the escaped slave Esteban Montejo.

From 1965, Enzensberger edited the magazine ; his writings influenced the 1968 West German student movement. He was editor of the prestigious book series , published in Frankfurt, from 1985; it reached almost 250 titles. He promoted the writers Ryszard Kapuscinski, Raoul Schrott, Irene Dische, Christoph Ransmayr, and W.G. Sebald, among others. Together with Gaston Salvatore, Enzensberger was the founder of the left-wing monthly . The literary journal survived for only two years. 

In his 1987 book Ach Europa! Wahrnehmungen aus sieben Ländern, Enzensberger used already the terms Ossi and Wessi.

Personal life
Enzensberger was the older brother of the author Christian Enzensberger. He was married three times, including Masha, and had two daughters, including . Mathematics was his passion.

Enzensberger lived in Norway, Italy, Mexico, Cuba, the United States, West Berlin, and since 1979 in Munich where he died on 24 November 2022, at age 93.

Work 
Enzensberger wrote in a sarcastic, ironic tone in many of his poems. For example, the poem "Middle Class Blues" consists of various typicalities of middle class life, with the phrase "we can't complain" repeated several times, and concludes with "what are we waiting for?". Many of his poems also feature themes of civil unrest over economic- and class-based issues. Though primarily a poet and essayist, he also ventured into theatre, film, opera, radio drama, reportage and translation. He wrote novels and several books for children (including The Number Devil, an exploration of mathematics, translated in 34 languages) and was co-author of a book for German as a foreign language, (Die Suche). He often wrote his poems and letters in lower case. Tumult, written in 2014, is an autobiographical reflection of his 1960s as a left-wing sympathizer visiting the Soviet Union and Cuba. His own work has been translated into more than 40 languages.

Enzensberger also invented and collaborated in the construction of a machine which automatically composes poems. This was used during the 2006 Football World Cup to commentate on games.

Enzensberger criticized the German orthography reform, the dominance of the internet and the construction of the EU.

Enzensberger translated Adam Zagajewski, Lars Gustafsson, Pablo Neruda, W. H. Auden and César Vallejo. With Irene Dische he wrote the libretto for Sallinen's fifth opera The Palace. The theatre premiere of a drama after his long poem Der Untergang der Titanic on 7 May 1980 was directed by George Tabori at the Werkraumtheater Munich.

Honors and awards 
In 2009, Enzensberger received a special lifetime recognition award given by the trustees of the Griffin Trust for Excellence in Poetry, which also awards the annual Griffin Poetry Prize.

 1951–1954 Grant from the Studienstiftung des Deutschen Volkes
 1963 Georg Büchner Prize
 1980 Golden Wreath of Struga Poetry Evenings
 1985 Heinrich-Böll-Preis
 1993 ; see also Erich Maria Remarque
 1997 Ernst-Robert-Curtius-Preis
 1998 Heinrich Heine Prize of Düsseldorf
 1999 Pour le Mérite for Sciences and Arts
 2002 Prince of Asturias Communications and Humanities award
 2002 Ludwig Börne Prize
 2009 Griffin Poetry Prize Lifetime Recognition Award
 2009 Sonning Prize – awarded for "commendable work for the benefit of European culture"
 2012 Honorary degree from Bard College in New York
 2015 
 2017 Poetry and People International Poetry Prize

Published works

Bibliography (English)

Articles

Notes

References

Further reading 
 
 
 
 
 Fritsche, Martin: Hans Magnus Enzensbergers produktionsorientierte Moral. Konstanten in der Ästhetik eines Widersachers der Gleichheit. Dissertation, Technische Universität Berlin; Peter Lang, Bern u. a. 1997, 264 p., hardcover, . (Zur politischen Haltung, politischen Polemik und Provokation im Werk Enzensbergers.)
 Rommerskirchen, Theo: Hans Magnus Enzensberger. In: viva signatur si! Remagen-Rolandseck 2005, .
 Barbey, Rainer: Unheimliche Fortschritte. Natur, Technik und Mechanisierung im Werk von Hans Magnus Enzensberger. dissertation, University of Regensburg; Vandenhoeck & Ruprecht, Göttingen 2007, 248 p., hardcover, Inhaltsverzeichnis (table of content, in German, PDF), Einleitung (introduction, in German, PDF).
 Cuervo, Francisco Adolfo Aristizábal: Der Dichter als Übersetzer: Auf Spurensuche: Hans Magnus Enzensbergers Übersetzungsmethode(n). Tectum Verlag, 2008, .
 Park, Hyun Jeong: "Das Ende der Welt ist vielleicht nur ein Provisorium". Ökologisch-postapokalyptisches Denken im lyrischen und essayistischen Werk Hans Magnus Enzensbergers. Diss, University of Munich, Aisthesis, Bielefeld 2010, .
 Hans Magnus Enzensberger und die Ideengeschichte der Bundesrepublik, with an Essay by Lars Gustafsson. Universitätsverlag Winter, 2010, 
 Clayton, Alan J.: Writing with the Words of Others: Essays on the Poetry of Hans Magnus Enzensberger. Würzburg: Königshausen & Neumann, 2010, 272 p., .
 Arnold, Heinz Ludwig (ed.): Text+Kritik: Hans Magnus Enzensberger, Edition Text+Kritik, third edition, 
 Marmulla, Henning: Enzensbergers Kursbuch. Eine Zeitschrift um 68.  2011, .

External links 

 
 Studienstiftung Enzensberger Lebenslauf 1951
 
 In conversation with Charles Simic 11 December 2002
 "The radical loser": English translation of an article originally in Der Spiegel on 7 November 2005
 Poesieautomat (Poetry-Machine) realized by Christian Bauer, 2006
 Griffin Poetry Prize Lifetime Recognition Award profile (including audio and video of tribute and acceptance speech)
 
 

1929 births
2022 deaths
Georg Büchner Prize winners
German male poets
German-language poets
Hitler Youth members
Order of Arts and Letters of Spain recipients
People from Kaufbeuren
Recipients of the Pour le Mérite (civil class)
Struga Poetry Evenings Golden Wreath laureates
Studienstiftung alumni
University of Erlangen-Nuremberg alumni
University of Freiburg alumni
University of Hamburg alumni
Writers from Bavaria